Mono Mills (also, Mono) is a ghost town in Mono County, California. Mono Mills has nearly vanished.

Background
Mono Mills started as a lumber camp that supplied Bodie's mines. The first sawmill was built in 1880. In 1881, a narrow-gauge railroad, Bodie & Benton Railway, was built from Mono Mills to Bodie. At its peak, Mono Mills shipped almost 45,000 cords of wood per year.

Gallery

References

External links

History of Mono County, California
Ghost towns in California
Former settlements in Mono County, California
California placenames of Native American origin